Altın Gün (meaning Golden Day in Turkish) is a Turkish psychedelic rock, also known as Anatolian rock, band from Amsterdam, Netherlands. It was founded by bassist Jasper Verhulst in 2016 when he posted an ad on Facebook looking for Turkish musicians. Their style has been described as "psychedelic" with a "dirty blend of funk rhythms, wah-wah guitars and analogue organs". Altın Gün also performs psychedelic rock covers of Turkish folk music. Both the band's vocalists, Merve Daşdemir and Erdinç Ecevit Yıldız, are of Turkish origin, while the other four members are Dutch.

Their debut album was On, released in 2018. In 2019, they released Gece which was nominated for the 62nd Annual Grammy Awards (2019) in the Best World Music Album category. The band's first American tour commenced in mid 2019.

Members
Altın Gün are:

 Jasper Verhulst: Bass
 Erdinç Ecevit Yıldız: Vocals, bağlama, keys
 Merve Daşdemir: Vocals, keys, small percussion
 Daniel Smienk: Drums
 Chris Bruining: Percussion
 Thijs Elzinga: Guitar

Discography

Albums
 2018 : On 
 2019 : Gece
 2021 : Yol 
 2021 : Âlem 
 2023 : Aşk

Singles
 2017 : "Goca Dünya" / "Kırşehir'in Gülleri"
 2018 : "Tatlı Dile Güler Yüze" / "Hababam" 
 2018 : "Cemalim" / "Vay Dünya"
 2019 : "Süpürgesi Yoncadan" 
 2019 : "Gelin Halayı" / "Dıv Dıv" 
 2020 : "Ordunun Dereleri" / "Bir Of Çeksem"
 2021 : "Yüce Dağ Başında"
 2021 : "Kısasa kısas"
 2022 : "Cips kola kilit" / "Badi Sabah Olmadan"
 2022 : "Leylim Ley"
 2023 : "Rakıya Su Katamam"

References

Dutch rock music groups
Turkish rock music groups
Dutch people of Turkish descent
ATO Records artists
Musical groups established in 2016
2016 establishments in the Netherlands
Musical groups from Amsterdam
Anatolian rock musicians